La Cage may include:

 La Cage (film) or The Cage, a 1963 French film
 "La Cage" (song), a song by Jean Michel Jarre

See also 
 La Cage aux Folles (disambiguation), often shortened to La Cage
 The Cage (disambiguation)